Akihiro Mera (目良明裕, Mera Akihiro, born 6 November 1967) is a Japanese sport shooter who competed in the 1988 Summer Olympics and in the 1992 Summer Olympics.

References

1967 births
Living people
Japanese male sport shooters
ISSF rifle shooters
Olympic shooters of Japan
Shooters at the 1988 Summer Olympics
Shooters at the 1992 Summer Olympics
Shooters at the 1990 Asian Games
Shooters at the 1994 Asian Games
Asian Games medalists in shooting
Place of birth missing (living people)
Asian Games gold medalists for Japan
Asian Games silver medalists for Japan
Asian Games bronze medalists for Japan
Medalists at the 1990 Asian Games
Medalists at the 1994 Asian Games
20th-century Japanese people